The 1966 United States Senate election in Delaware took place on November 8, 1966. Incumbent Republican U.S. Senator J. Caleb Boggs was re-elected to a second term in office. , this is the last time a Republican has won Delaware’s Class 2 Senate seat.

General election

Candidates
J. Caleb Boggs, incumbent U.S. Senator (Republican)
James M. Tunnell Jr., former Justice of the Delaware Supreme Court and son of former Senator James M. Tunnell (Democratic)

Results

See also 
 1966 United States Senate elections

References

Delaware
1966
1966 Delaware elections